Per Juvkam (1907–2003) was a Norwegian Lutheran Bishop. He was born in 1907 in Sør-Aurdal in Oppland county, Norway.  He served as Bishop of the Diocese of Bjørgvin from 1961 to 1977.

Juvkam began his career as a priest in Vestre Toten in 1938.  He served there until 1950 when he took a new job as the head parish priest for the parish of Vestre Slidre.  In 1957, he took a new job as a priest in the Sinsen parish in Oslo. After 3 years on that job, in 1961 he was named the Bishop of the Diocese of Bjørgvin, based in the city of Bergen. He retired in 1971.

Juvkam did some writing in the 1970s and 1980s during his retirement.  Among his publications are a collection of sermons called Høgtidsdagar i Bjørgvin from 1977 and a book about the church in Norway Folkekirken – visjon og virkelighet from 1980.  He also worked on the translation of the Bible into Nynorsk.

Juvkam died in Oslo on 22 February 2003 at the age of 95.

References

1907 births
2003 deaths
Bishops of Bjørgvin
Norwegian non-fiction writers
Norwegian religious writers
20th-century non-fiction writers
People from Sør-Aurdal